Mencía is a feminine given name of Spanish origin, as well as a surname. It may refer to:

People
 Aída Mencía Ripley, Dominican scientist
 Mencía Calderón (1514–1564), Spanish noble lady and expeditionary woman
 Mencía López de Haro (1215–1270), Castilian noblewoman, Queen consort of Portugal
 Mencía de Mendoza (1508–1554), Dutch culture patron
 Carlos Mencía (b. 1967), American comedian of Honduran origin
 María Mencía, Spanish artist and researcher

Other uses 
 Mencía (grape), grape variety from Spain
 Doña Mencía, Córdoba, Spain
 Mind of Mencia, TV show
 Epicopeia mencia, moth species